Worth is an unincorporated community in McDowell County, West Virginia, United States.

The community was named after Worth Kilpatrick, a coal mining official.

References

Unincorporated communities in McDowell County, West Virginia
Unincorporated communities in West Virginia